Lee Ji-seung (born 11 January 1999) is a South Korean professional footballer who plays as a midfielder for Gyeongnam FC.

Career
Lee joined Busan IPark from Ulsan Hyundai and made his debut for the club in an FA Cup game with Hwaseong FC on 1 July 2020. He went on to make two further appearances in the cup that year. After his contract with the club expired at the end of 2020, Lee signed a new contract to stay with the club into the 2021 season.

Career statistics

Club

Notes

References

External links

1999 births
Living people
South Korean footballers
Association football midfielders
K League 2 players
Busan IPark players
Gyeongnam FC players